Karreh may refer to various places in Iran:
 Karreh, Charam, Kohgiluyeh and Boyer-Ahmad Province
 Karreh, Dana, Kohgiluyeh and Boyer-Ahmad Province
 Karreh-ye Olya, Kohgiluyeh and Boyer-Ahmad Province
 Karreh-ye Sofla, Kohgiluyeh and Boyer-Ahmad Province
 Karreh Dan Zizi, Kohgiluyeh and Boyer-Ahmad Province
 Karreh Shahbazi, Kohgiluyeh and Boyer-Ahmad Province
 Karreh Shekaf, Lorestan Province

See also

Karre
 Koreh (disambiguation)